Tyree Appleby (born September 30, 1998) is an American college basketball player for the Wake Forest Demon Deacons of the Atlantic Coast Conference (ACC). He played for the Cleveland State Vikings and Florida Gators prior to Wake Forest.

After starring at Jacksonville High School in Jacksonville, Arkansas, Appleby signed with coach Dennis Felton at Cleveland State. After a freshman season where he averaged 11.8 points and 4 assists per game and earned Horizon League all-freshman team honors, the point guard matured into one of the top players in the conference as a sophomore. As a sophomore for the Vikings, he averaged 17.2 points and 5.6 assists, earning second-team All-Horizon League honors. 

After Felton was fired, Appleby transferred to Florida following the 2018–19 season. After sitting out a year per NCAA transfer rules, Appleby played two seasons for the Gators, averaging 11.1 points and 3.5 assists per game.

For the 2022–23 season, Appleby chose to play his final season of eligibility playing for coach Steve Forbes at Wake Forest. Early in the season, Appleby signed a Name, Image and Likeness (NIL) deal with restaurant chain Applebee's, playing off the similarity of his surname to the brand name. Appleby established himself as one of the top players in the Atlantic Coast Conference (ACC), leading the league in both scoring and assists through the last week of February. Appleby passed the 2,000 career point milestone on February 7, 2023.

References

External links
Wake Forest Demon Deacons bio
Florida Gators bio
Cleveland State Vikings bio
College stats @ sports-reference.com

1998 births
Living people
American men's basketball players
Basketball players from Arkansas
Cleveland State Vikings men's basketball players
Florida Gators men's basketball players
Jacksonville High School (Arkansas) alumni
People from Jacksonville, Arkansas
Point guards
Sportspeople from Little Rock, Arkansas
Wake Forest Demon Deacons men's basketball players